Collender may refer to:

Collender, a family name of European origin
H.W. Collender Co., a billiard equipment manufacturer of New York which merged with the Brunswick & Balke Company in 1884 to form today's Brunswick Corporation

See also
Colander